is a town located in Tagawa District, Fukuoka Prefecture, Japan.

As of 2016, the town has an estimated population of 5,127 and a density of 360 persons per km². The total area is 14.24 km².

The town is known for its small, palm-sized mangoes.

References

External links

Ōtō official website 

Towns in Fukuoka Prefecture